Defending champion Rafael Nadal defeated Tommy Robredo in the final, 6–4, 6–4, 6–0 to win the singles title at the 2006 Barcelona Open.

Seeds

Draw

Key
WC - Wildcard
Q - Qualifier
LL - Lucky loser

Finals

Earlier rounds

Section 1

Section 2

Section 3

Section 4

 Single Draw
 Qualifying Draw

Torneo Godo
2006 Torneo Godó